The Hand of Franklin is a 2015 Canadian documentary film by Frank Wolf that follows a four-person team attempting to row the Northwest Passage in order to shed light on climate change in the Arctic. The film won the award for 'Best Documentary Feature' at the 2016 Ramunas Atelier International Film Awards, won for 'Best Canadian Film' at the 2015 Vancouver International Mountain Film Festival (VIMFF) and won the 'Adventure Award' at the 2016 San Francisco International Ocean Film Festival. It features music by Peirson Ross, The Cyrillic Typewriter, Sylvia Cloutier and Madeleine Allakariallak and airs in Canada on CBC's documentary channel.

References

External links

Hand of Franklin on IMDB
Expedition website
Sun profile of The Hand of Franklin
Official Film Website

2015 films
2015 documentary films
Canadian documentary films
Documentary films about the Arctic
Documentary films about global warming
Documentary films about water transport
Environment of the Arctic
Climate change in Canada
Films directed by Frank Wolf
2010s Canadian films